St. Paul's Church, Leamington Spa is a Grade II listed parish church in Leamington Spa, England.

History

St. Paul's Church was built between 1873 and 1874 to designs by the architect John Cundall of Leaminton. It was formed from the parish of St. Mary's. The church had 1150 seats, half free, and half rented to pay the Vicar's stipend.

The church and associated parish rooms were subject to later additions and alterations. These included a redevelopment in the 1980s by architect John Holmes.

List of vicars

1877 - 1894 James Bradley 
1894 - 1910 George Edward Augustus Pargiter MA 
1910 - 1919 James Mervyn Glass 
1919 - 1928 Robert Woods Colquhoun MA 
1928 - 1934 George Ernest Arrowsmith MA 
1934 - 1947 William Walton Rogers MA 
1947 - 1962 John Charles Dunham MA 
1963 - 1977 Norman Leonard Warren MA 
1978 - 1988 Andrew J M Dow MA 
1988 - 1999 Bill Merrington BSc, MPhil 
2000 - current Jonathan Noel Jee MA

References

Gothic Revival church buildings in England
Leamington, St Paul
Leamington, St Paul
Buildings and structures in Leamington Spa
Leamington, St Paul